Spomenko Bošnjak (born 18 July 1973) is a former Bosnian-Herzegovinian footballer.

Club career
An ethnic Croat, he started his career at NK Hrvatski dragovoljac at Prva HNL. He then played for NK Dinamo Zagreb and Ukrainian side FC Metalurh Zaporizhya. At age of 33, he returned to Bosnia and Herzegovina and played for NK Široki Brijeg and NK Kreševo-Stanić.

International career
Bošnjak was capped twice for Bosnia and Herzegovina, he made his debut on 11 October 2002 against Germany, a friendly. On 16 October he played his last match against Norway for European Championship qualification.

References

External links

 

1973 births
Living people
Croats of Bosnia and Herzegovina
Association football defenders
Bosnia and Herzegovina footballers
Bosnia and Herzegovina international footballers
NK Hrvatski Dragovoljac players
GNK Dinamo Zagreb players
FC Metalurh Zaporizhzhia players
NK Široki Brijeg players
Croatian Football League players
Ukrainian Premier League players
Premier League of Bosnia and Herzegovina players
First League of the Federation of Bosnia and Herzegovina players
Bosnia and Herzegovina expatriate footballers
Expatriate footballers in Croatia
Bosnia and Herzegovina expatriate sportspeople in Croatia
Expatriate footballers in Ukraine
Bosnia and Herzegovina expatriate sportspeople in Ukraine